Amritsar–Jamnagar Expressway (NH-754) is an under-construction 1,257 km long, 4/6-lane wide expressway in the north-western part of India. The expressway will reduce the distance and time travel between Amritsar and Jamnagar from earlier 1,430 km to 1,316 km (including Kapurthala-Amritsar section) and the time travel from 26 hours to only 13 hours. It is a part of the Bharatmala and Amritsar–Jamnagar Economic Corridor (EC-3). It will pass through four states of Punjab, Haryana, Rajasthan and Gujarat. 

The expressway is strategically important, as it will connect 3 big oil refineries of HMEL Bathinda, HPCL Barmer and RIL Jamnagar. It will also connect Guru Nanak Dev Thermal Plant (Bathinda) and Suratgarh Super Thermal Power Plant (Sri Ganganagar).

The expressway will meet the Ludhiana-Bathinda-Ajmer Expressway of the Pathankot–Ajmer Economic Corridor at Bathinda. The construction work on the expressway started in Haryana and Rajasthan in 2019, and it is expected to be completed by September 2023.

Background 
This expressway is a part of Bharatmala's Phase-I, which is funded by the National Investment and Infrastructure Fund (NIIF) in phases.

Route

The expressway will be the first expressway in India, connecting three oil refineries of Bathinda, Barmer and Jamnagar. The Barmer Refinery is set to be completed by March 2023. Nearly 50% of the length of the expressway, i.e, 637 km falls under Rajasthan. The total project value including the land acquisition cost is nearly ₹80,000 crores.

Route summary by state

Punjab

In Punjab, it will start at Tibba village in Kapurthala district on Delhi–Amritsar–Katra Expressway (NE-5A), and will end near Punjab-Haryana border in Bathinda district on NH-54. The expressway on th Tibba–Moga–Bathinda stretch was re-planned by the NHAI to make it a greenfield expressway.
 Amritsar to Tibba NE-5A 
 Tibba on NE-5A.
 NH-703 Moga to Jalandhar Road, intersects near Dharmkot.
 Bhata Bhai ka to Bhadaur Road, intersects near Dyalpura Bhai Ka. 
 Rampura Phul, intersects Ludhiana-Bhatinda Expressway section of Pathankot–Ajmer Expressway.
 NH-54 Mandi Dabwali to Bathinda Road, intersects near Sangat Kalan.

Haryana

In Haryana, it will run entirely in the Sirsa district and it will not be access controlled. It will enter at Mandi Dabwali and exit at Haryana/Rajasthan border at Chautala village.

 Sirsa district 
 Dabwali
 Pathrala, east of Dabwali, on NH54 Dabwali-Bhatinda highway.

 South of Dabwali on NH9 Dabwali-Sirsa-Hisar-Delhi highway.

 Southwest of Dabwali near Alika on SH34 Dabwali-Ellenabad highway.

 Sakta Khera

 Chautala on Chautala- Sangaria road

Rajasthan

In Rajasthan, it will enter through the Sangaria town in Hanumangarh district. From there it will pass through Bikaner district, Jodhpur district and Barmer district, before exiting Rajasthan at Sanchore town in Jalore district.

 Hanumangarh district. 
 10 SBN near Sangaria town.
 Hanumangarh city at Kolha on south side on SH36.
 28 NDR on Pilibanga-Rawatsar road.
 2 KND
 Jaitpur toll plaza on MDR34 between Arjansar-Pallu.

 Bikaner district
 between Lunkaransar-Kalu on SH6A.
 Sahajarasar between Direran and Kalu.
 Norangdesar on NH11 Bikaner-Dungargarh-Ratangarh-Jhunjhunu-Chirawa-Loharu-Charkhi Dadri-Delhi highway.
 Desnok-Rasisar on NH62 Bikaner-Nokha-Nagaur highway.

 Jodhpur district
 Sri Lachhamannag on SH19 Phalodi-Nagaur highway.
 Bhikamkor-Osian on SH61 on Phalodi-Osian highway.

 Barmer district
 Dhandhaniya-Agolai
 Patau on NH25 Pachpadra-Jodhpur highway.

 Jalore district
 Pachpadra
 Balotra 
 on SH61 Balotra-Samdari-Jodhpur highway.
 NH325 Balotra-Siwana-Jalore highway.
 Padroo
 Dahiva
 Bagoda
 Sanchore

Gujarat

In Gujarat, it will enter at Vantdau in Banaskantha district, run through Patan district. From there the existing National Highway Network takes the route to Kutch district and Morbi district before finally ending at Jamnagar district.

 Banaskantha district
 Tharad
 Vasarda on NH68
 Uchosan SH861
 Jamvada SH127

 Patan district
 Santalpur on NH27

Route summary by sections
The construction work of the expressway has been divided into 8 sections (5 greenfield alignment and 3 brownfield upgrades). With a total of 30 construction packages each with a construction period of 2 years. The projects is expected to be completed by September 2023.

As related but separate projects, from Samakhiali the existing highways Samakhiali-Bhachau-Bhimasar-Gandhidham-Mundra, Bhachau-Bhuj, Bhimasar-Anjar-Ratnal-Bhuj will also be upgraded to provide connectivity to other ports and cities.

Construction
The NHAI has awarded the construction work in 30 packages (stretches) to various construction companies. The list of contractors is as follows:

Note: As of 28 July 2021, contracts for 6 out of total of 30 packages in pending.

Status updates
 Oct 2018: Detailed Project Report (DPR) is completed. The expressway will connect 3 oil refineries of Bathinda, Barmer and Jamnagar.
 Jul 2019: The NIIF will be financing the project.
 Oct 2019: NHAI invites bids for the various phases of the expressway.
 Aug 2020: The expressway will be ready before March 2023.
 Oct 2020: Land acquisition starts for Amritsar-Bathinda greenfield stretch of the expressway.
 Feb 2021: The construction work of the expressway will begin in April 2021.
 April 2022: The construction works started on all the 30 packages would be completed within 2 years.
 May 2022: Out of the expressway's 155-km stretch from Amritsar to Bathinda, work is going on in an advanced stage, and the 762-km stretch from Sangaria in Rajasthan to Santalpur in Gujarat, Out of which 400 km is completed, while the remaining portion is under-construction. The expressway is now expected to be completed by September 2023.
 Dec 2025: Project Completion on approx. Dec 2025

See also

 Bharatmala
 Expressways in India
 Delhi–Mumbai Expressway
 Amritsar Ring Road
 Delhi–Amritsar–Katra Expressway

References

Expressways in Haryana
Expressways in Punjab, India
Expressways in Rajasthan
Expressways in Gujarat
Transport in Amritsar
Transport in Jamnagar